Dicerca moesta is a species of beetle from Argante subgenus which can be found everywhere in Europe (except for various European islands).

References

Beetles described in 1793
Beetles of Europe
Buprestidae